Sand Lake is the name of some places in the U.S. state of Wisconsin:

Sand Lake, Burnett County, Wisconsin, a town
Sand Lake, Sawyer County, Wisconsin, a town
Sand Lake, Polk County, Wisconsin, an unincorporated community